Carl Larson may refer to:

Carl Larson (basketball) in AAU Men's Basketball All-Americans
Carl Larson, pen name of George Tuska

See also
Carl Larsson, Swedish painter
Carl Larsen (disambiguation)
Karl Larsen (disambiguation)
Karl Larsson (disambiguation)